The Chinese Taipei Cycling Association (CTCA) is the national governing body of cycle racing for the Republic of China (Taiwan).

It is a member of the UCI and the Asian Cycling Confederation.

See also
 Chinese Taipei

References

External links
 Chinese Taipei Cycling Association official website

National members of the Asian Cycling Confederation
Cycle racing organizations
Cycle racing in Taiwan
Cycling